Akra Peninsula is the mostly ice-covered peninsula projecting 11 km eastwards from Oscar II Coast in Graham Land, and 5.2 km wide, bounded by Exasperation Inlet to the north and Scar Inlet to the south, and ending in Cape Disappointment to the east.  It was formed as a result of the break-up of Larsen Ice Shelf in the area, and the retreat of Pequod Glacier in the early 21st century.  The feature is named after the ancient town of Akra in Southeastern Bulgaria.

Location
SCAR Antarctic Digital Database mapping in 2012.

Maps
Antarctic Digital Database (ADD). Scale 1:250000 topographic map of Antarctica. Scientific Committee on Antarctic Research (SCAR). Since 1993, regularly upgraded and updated.

References
 Akra Peninsula. SCAR Composite Antarctic Gazetteer.
 Bulgarian Antarctic Gazetteer. Antarctic Place-names Commission. (details in Bulgarian, basic data in English)

External links
Akra Peninsula. Copernix satellite image

Peninsulas of Graham Land
Oscar II Coast
Bulgaria and the Antarctic